The Saint Kitts and Nevis National Cup is the top knockout tournament of the Saint Kitts and Nevis football.

Winners
2001/02 : Cayon Rockets (Cayon)
2002/03 : Village Superstars FC (Basseterre) 1-0 Newtown United FC (Basseterre)
2003/04 : Village Superstars FC (Basseterre) 3-1 Cayon Rockets (Cayon)
2004/05 : unknown
2005/06 : unknown
2006/07 : Newtown United FC (Basseterre) awd Village Superstars FC (Basseterre)
2007/08 : unknown
2008/09 : unknown
2009/10 : Newtown United FC (Basseterre) 2-0 St. Paul's United (Basseterre)
2010/11 : Village Superstars FC (Basseterre) 4-3 Mantab
2011/12 : St. Paul's United (Basseterre) 2-1 Newtown United FC (Basseterre)
2012/13 : Conaree United FC 1-1 Newtown United FC (Basseterre) [aet, 5-4 pen]
2013/14 : Newtown United FC (Basseterre) 1-0 Garden Hotspurs FC (Basseterre)
2014/15 : Conaree United FC 2-2 Cayon Rockets (Cayon) [aet, 6-5 pen]
2015/16 : Garden Hotspurs FC (Basseterre) 2-1 Conaree United FC
2016/17 : Village Superstars FC (Basseterre) 1-0 Newtown United FC (Basseterre)
2017/18 : Cayon Rockets (Cayon) 1-1 Conaree United FC [aet, 4-2 pen]

References

Football competitions in Saint Kitts and Nevis
National association football cups